PLS or Pls may refer to:

Organizations
 Pioneer Library System, Oklahoma, US
 Poculi Ludique Societas, Medieval & Renaissance Players of Toronto, Canada
 Profesjonalna Liga Siatkówki, Polish Volleyball League
 Premier League Soccer, an Indian football league
 Prometheus Light and Sound, US home PBX company, 1990s
Pilbara Minerals Ltd, an Australian ASX-listed lithium mining company.

Science and technology
 Palomar–Leiden survey of minor planets
 Partial least squares regression, a statistical method
 Plasma spectrometer, an instrument aboard the Voyager 1 and 2 space probes 
 Pregnant leach solution, a mining process

Computers
 PLS (complexity), a complexity class
 PLS (file format), multimedia playlist format
 Pronunciation Lexicon Specification, for interoperable pronunciation information
 Super PLS, a Samsung IPS panel technology
 IBM PL/S, a programming language

Medicine and biology
 Papillon–Lefèvre syndrome, a disease affecting the teeth and skin
 Primary lateral sclerosis, a disease characterized by weakness
 Proteus-like syndrome, similar to Proteus syndrome
 Polish Lowland Sheepdog

Transportation
 Palletized load system, U.S. Army logistics system
 Providenciales International Airport, Turks and Caicos Islands, IATA code
 Pleasington railway station, England, station code

Other
 Profit and loss sharing, a concept in Islamic finance similar to equity financing
 Public Land Strip, former name for the Oklahoma Panhandle